The National College of Art and Design was established in 1818.

In 1996 the National College of Art and Design became part of Oslo National Academy of the Arts (Kunsthøgskolen i Oslo, KHiO).

Noted alumni

External links
Oslo National Academy of the Arts

Craft and Art Industry
Craft and Art Industry
Educational institutions established in 1818
Educational institutions disestablished in 1996
Arts organizations established in the 1810s